Band-e Now is a village in Tujerdi Rural District, Sarchehan District, Bavanat County, Fars Province, Iran. At the 2006 census, its population was 252, in 69 families.

References 

Populated places in Sarchehan County